Alexander Granach (April 18, 1890 – March 14, 1945) was a German-Austrian actor in the 1920s and 1930s who emigrated to the United States in 1938.

Life and career 
Granach was born Schaje Granoch in Werbowitz (Wierzbowce/Werbiwci) (Austrian Galicia then, now Verbivtsi, Kolomyia Raion, Ivano-Frankivsk Oblast, Ukraine), to Jewish parents and rose to theatrical prominence at the Volksbühne in Berlin. Granach entered films in 1922; among the most widely exhibited of his silent efforts was Nosferatu (1922), F.W. Murnau’s loose adaptation of Dracula, in which the actor was cast as Knock, the film's counterpart to Renfield. He co-starred in such major early German talkies as Kameradschaft (1931).

The Jewish Granach fled to the Soviet Union when Adolf Hitler came to power in Germany. When the Soviet Union also proved inhospitable, he settled in Hollywood, where he made his first American film appearance as Kopalski in Ninotchka (1939) starring Greta Garbo and directed by Ernst Lubitsch, released by Metro-Goldwyn-Mayer. Granach proved indispensable to film makers during the war years, effectively portraying both dedicated Nazis (he was Julius Streicher in The Hitler Gang, 1944) and loyal anti-fascists. He portrayed Gestapo Inspector Alois Gruber in Fritz Lang’s Hangmen Also Die! (1943). His last film appearance was in MGM's The Seventh Cross (1944), in which almost the entire supporting cast was prominent European refugees.

Granach died on March 14, 1945, in New York from a pulmonary embolism following an appendectomy. He was buried in Montefiore Cemetery in Springfield Gardens, Queens. Granach's autobiography, There Goes an Actor (1945) was republished in 2010 under the new title, From the Shtetl to the Stage: The Odyssey of a Wandering Actor (Transaction Publishers). He was survived by his long time partner, Lotte Lieven, and by his son, Gad Granach. His son, who lived in Jerusalem, wrote his own memoirs with many references to his father.

Partial filmography 

 Das goldene Buch (1919)
 Die Liebe vom Zigeuner stammt... (1920)
 Camera Obscura (1921) – Der große Chef
 The Big Big Boss (1921) – Der große Chef
 Nosferatu (1922) – Knock 
 Lucrezia Borgia (1922) – Prisoner
 Mignon (1922) – Il Gobbo
 Earth Spirit (1923) – Schigolch
 Fridericus Rex  (1923) – Hans Joachim von Ziethen
 Paganini (1923) – Ferucchio
 Man by the Wayside (1923) – Shoemaker
 Schatten – Eine nächtliche Halluzination (1923) – Shadowplayer
 A Woman, an Animal, a Diamond (1923) – Archivar Lindhorst
 I.N.R.I. (1923) – Judas Ischariot
 Die Radio Heirat (1924)
 Wood Love (1925) – Waldschrat – a sprite
 Torments of the Night (1926) – Murphy
 Hoppla, wir leben! (1927)
 Svengali (1927) – Geiger Gecko
 The Famous Woman (1927) – Diener bei Alfredo
 I Once Had a Beautiful Homeland (1928) – Pollaczek, sein Bursche
 The Adjutant of the Czar (1929) – Stranger
 The Last Fort (1929) – Gestino
 Pavement Butterfly (1929) – Coco
 Flucht in die Fremdenlegion (1929) – Beppo, Legionär
 The Last Company (1930) – Haberling
 1914 (1931) – Friend of Jaurès
 Danton (1931) – Marat
 The Theft of the Mona Lisa (1931) – Redner
 Kameradschaft (1931) – Kasper
 Gypsies (1936) – Danilo – Camp Driver
 Bortsy (1936) – Rovelli
 Ninotchka (1939) – Comrade Kopalski
 The Hunchback of Notre Dame (1939) – Soldier (uncredited)
 Foreign Correspondent (1940) – Hotel Valet (uncredited)
 So Ends Our Night (1941) – The Pole
 A Man Betrayed (1941) – T. Amato
 It Started with Eve (1941) – Popalard – Apartment Tenant (uncredited)
 Marry the Boss's Daughter (1941) – Nick (uncredited)
 Joan of Paris (1942) – Gestapo Agent
 Joan of Ozark (1942) – Guido
 Halfway to Shanghai (1942) – Mr. Nikolas
 Northwest Rangers (1942) – Pierre – Man in Casino (uncredited)
 Wrecking Crew (1942) – Joe Poska
 Hangmen Also Die! (1943) – Gestapo Insp. Alois Gruber
 Mission to Moscow (1943) – Russian Air Force Officer (uncredited)
 For Whom the Bell Tolls (1943) – Paco
 Three Russian Girls (1943) – Major Braginski
 Voice in the Wind (1944) – Angelo
 The Hitler Gang (1944) – Julius Streicher
 The Seventh Cross (1944) – Zillich
 My Buddy (1944) – Tim Oberta (final film role)

Literature
 Alexander Granach: There Goes an Actor. Doubleday, Dorian and Co, Inc., Garden City 1945, ASIN B0007DSBEM
 Alexander Granach: There Goes a Mensch: A Memoir. Atara Press, Los Angeles 2019, 
 Alexander Granach: Da geht ein Mensch. Ölbaum-Verlag, Augsburg 2003, (Neuauflage) 
 Alexander Granach: From the Shtetl to the Stage: The Odyssey of a Wandering Actor. Transaction Publishers, 2010, 
 Albert Klein and Raya Kruk: Alexander Granach: fast verwehte Spuren. , Berlin 1994, 
 Alexander Granach: Mémoires d'un gardien de bordel. Anatolia, Paris 2009, 
 Gad Granach: Heimat los!. Ölbaum-Verlag, Augsburg 1997, 
Gad Granach: Where Is Home? Stories from the Life of a German-Jewish Émigré. Atara Press, Los Angeles 2009,

References

External links
 
 
 
 
 

1890 births
1945 deaths
People from Ivano-Frankivsk Oblast
People from the Kingdom of Galicia and Lodomeria
Jews from Galicia (Eastern Europe)
Austro-Hungarian Jews
Ukrainian Jews
Jewish German male actors
German male film actors
German male silent film actors
Ernst Busch Academy of Dramatic Arts alumni
Austro-Hungarian emigrants to Germany
Jewish emigrants from Nazi Germany to the United States
20th-century German male actors
Jewish Ukrainian actors
Deaths from pulmonary embolism